With You Now is the second EP and from the Christian singer-songwriter Ellie Holcomb. The EP released on August 19, 2013, by Good Time Records. This EP received commercial success and it garnered a few positive reviews.

Background
The EP released on August 19, 2013, by Good Time Records, and this was her second EP.

Critical reception

With You Now received two positive reviews from music critics. At CCM Magazine, Matt Conner rated the album four out of five stars, writing that "the talented songwriter creates beautiful music on her own, and her new EP With You Now is proof positive." Jonathan Andre of Indie Vision Music rated the album four stars, stating that "Ellie’s EP is a fresh, invigorating, unique and encouraging precursor to what listeners can expect come February next year."

Commercial performance
For the Billboard charting week of September 7, 2013, With You Now was the No. 7 most sold album on the Christian Albums chart.

Track listing

Charts

References

2013 EPs
Ellie Holcomb albums